Soluto was a device protection software developer that helped users to identify and correct problems in Microsoft Windows. It developed an identically named product offering that integrated a mobile app, web portal, proactive communications, and remote device management into one service. As part of a premium service, Soluto enabled users to contact premier support technicians. Soluto offered access via the web as part of Soluto PC Management platform.

History
Soluto was founded in 2008 and received US$1.6 million in seed funding from Proxima Ventures. This was followed-up with a $6.2M second round of financing led by Bessemer Venture Partners and joined by Giza Venture Capital, in March 2009. After the 2009 financisation, Israeli politician Naftali Bennett was brought in by investors as CEO. Bennett made several structural changes to the company, bringing on his brothers, Asher and Dan, as co-executives. Asher, a respected expert in cryptography and graduate of the Technion, worked on expanding the range of solutions, while Dan, a graduate of McGill University, brought expertise in managing technical startups, specializing in user protection, in their infancy.

Acquisition
In 2013, Soluto was acquired by Asurion, LLC. Soluto ceased operation of the Soluto PC Management platform on April 1, 2016. at the time of purchase, it had 40 employees.

Funding

 Soluto is funded by Index Ventures, Bessemer Venture Partners, Giza Venture Capital, Proxima Ventures, Crunch Fund, Innovation Endeavors, Initial Capital, and angel investors including Chris Dixon, Yuval Ne'eman, Saar Gillai, and Nadav Zohar.
 Soluto was purchased by Asurion on November 12, 2013, for a reported $130M.

Awards

 Soluto won TechCrunch Disrupt in 2010.
 Soluto was named one of the 2010 Always On Global Top Private Companies. Lifehacker named Soluto one of the most popular free Windows downloads of 2010.

Dissolution 
In 2022, Asurion decided to dissolve Soluto in order to "focus its current growth on the cellular market". The dissolution process included closing down Soluto's R&D center in Tel Aviv, and laying off all of its 120 employees.

Features

The original Soluto features are listed below.

Dashboard
The Soluto dashboard has 6 sections, divided into categories of technical information that the user can see and remote actions the user can initiate: 
 Frustrations: view information about non-responsive applications, recent application crashes, possible causes for crashes, and crash solutions. 
 Apps: view a list of applications that have available updates and start the updates. View a list of applications that can be remotely downloaded and installed on the PC, and start the downloads. 
 Background Apps: view the list of applications that start when the computer boots up, descriptions of the applications, and recommended actions based on the actions taken by other Soluto users. Remove applications from boot up or set applications to launch shortly after boot up. 
 Internet: select or install a default browser, set the homepage, and change the default search engine. View enabled toolbars and add-ons, descriptions of them, and whether Soluto recommends the item be disabled. Disable toolbars and add-ons. 
 Protection: turn on the PC's firewall, view or install antivirus software, and install Windows updates. 
 Hardware: View technical info about the PC's hardware, including available memory and battery health. Defrag the hard drives.

Downloaded Agent
Soluto uses a downloaded agent to transmit data to, and receive data from, Soluto's back-end servers. Data transmitted to Soluto includes the apps running during boot up, enabled browser toolbars and add-ons, hardware specs, and a specialized form of crash reports. The servers send back to the agent information such as solutions for recent crashes and the remote actions that were initiated by the user and need to occur.

References

Cloud applications
Software companies of Israel
Software companies established in 2008
Information technology management
Companies based in Tel Aviv
2008 establishments in Israel
2013 mergers and acquisitions
Naftali Bennett
Software companies disestablished in 2016
2016 disestablishments in Israel